Eric Morgan Yeatman is a Professor of Electrical Engineering at Imperial College London in London, UK.   He is an expert in micro-electromechanical systems (MEMS) and was the co-founder and Director of Microsaic Systems.

Awards 

In 2011, Yeatman received the Royal Academy of Engineering Silver Medal, and in 2012 he was made a Fellow of the Academy. In 2013, Yeatman was named as a Fellow of the Institute of Electrical and Electronics Engineers (IEEE)  for "contributions to the development of micro-electro-mechanical devices." He is also a Fellow of the City and Guilds of London Institute, the Institution of Engineering and Technology and the Institute of Materials, Minerals and Mining.

References 

Fellow Members of the IEEE
Living people
Year of birth missing (living people)
Academics of Imperial College London

Fellows of the Institute of Materials, Minerals and Mining